Gold Rush, Shanghai, also known by other titles like Gold Rush. The Last Days of Kuomintang, Shanghai, is a black and white photograph taken by Henri Cartier-Bresson in 1948.

History and description
Cartier-Bresson went to China in December 1948, on assignment for Life magazine, initially for a short trip, but ended up staying for a much longer time, as he documented the historical events and the general environment as the Kuomintang government fell while the Chinese Communist Party was about to seize power and to proclaim what would become the People's Republic of China, in 1949.

This is one of the most famous pictures out of the large amount that he took during this period. It was taken in Shanghai, on 23 December 1948, and documents what happened when the currency crashed and the Kuomintang decided to distribute 14 grams of gold by person. This resulted in thousands of people who waited in line to trade the gold for money, often suffocating to the point of death.

The picture shows one of these events, it was entirely spontaneous, despite what might appear as a choreographed composition, and depicts a crowd of desperate customers, both men and women, pressing themselves as they try anxiously to reach the bank where they want to sell their gold. Cartier-Bresson waited carefully for the dramatic shape to take place and then captured it for posterity.

Public collections
There are prints of this photograph at the Henri Cartier-Bresson Foundation, in Paris, the Museum Ludwig, in Cologne, and at the Metropolitan Museum of Art, in New York.

References

1948 in art
Black-and-white photographs
1940s photographs
Photographs by Henri Cartier-Bresson
Photographs of the Metropolitan Museum of Art
Collections of the Museum Ludwig